Howard Y T Cheng (born 18 Jul 1981) was champion apprentice in Hong Kong in 1999/2000 and 2000/2001. He ran up a score of 40 wins in 2010/11. This put him in sixth place in the championship table and brought his career aggregate to 347. His one win in 2013/14 took his career tally of 408 Hong Kong wins.

Major Wins
HKG3 Premier Bowl - Cerise Cherry (2011)

Performance

References

The Hong Kong Jockey Club 

Hong Kong jockeys
Living people
1981 births